Hum Dil De Chuke Sanam is a 1999 Indian Hindi-language romantic musical film directed by Sanjay Leela Bhansali. It was released internationally as Straight From the Heart. The film stars Salman Khan, Ajay Devgn, and Aishwarya Rai. Based on Rashtriyashayar Jhaverchand Meghani's play "Shetal ne Kathe", the film narrates the story of a newlywed man who discovers that his wife is in love with another man, and decides to unite them. The film has also been described as a loose adaptation of Maitreyi Devi's Bengali novel Na Hanyate, although the film itself does not credit it as a source.

It was filmed throughout the Gujarat-Rajasthan border region, in addition to Budapest, Hungary, which was used to represent Italy. The film premiered in the Indian Panorama section at the 1999 International Film Festival of India. The Bengali film Neel Akasher Chandni was inspired by this movie.

The film was a commercial success and emerged as one of the highest-grossing Indian films of the year, earning . It received predominantly positive reviews from critics. Hum Dil De Chuke Sanam received 17 nominations at the 45th Filmfare Awards, including Best Actor (Khan and Devgn), and won 7 awards, including Best Film, Best Director (Bhansali), Best Actress (Rai), and Best Male Playback Singer (Udit Narayan).

Plot 
Nandini (Aishwarya Rai) is the daughter of Pundit Darbar (Vikram Gokhale), a renowned proponent of Indian classical music. It is announced that a young man named Sameer (Salman Khan) will be arriving to stay with the Darbar family, as he wants to grasp the intricacies of Indian classical music under the guidance of the Pundit. He is accommodated in Nandini's room, causing her to shift elsewhere and, hence, take a dislike to Sameer. At first, the two tease and prank one another, but soon enough, they fall deeply in love. The two share romantic moments during several family events, including weddings and festivals.

One day, the couple is caught rehearsing their wedding vows by the Pundit. The old man is enraged since he has already planned Nandini's wedding with the young lawyer Vanraj (Ajay Devgn), who had fallen in love with her during her cousin Anu's wedding. Sameer is banished from the household, and the Pundit quits singing since he believes Nandini has brought shame to the family. Sameer is made to vow that he'll never meet Nandini again. Although he initially acquiesces and leaves for Italy, he soon starts writing letters to Nandini, asking her to join him, but his letters do not reach her. After a futile suicide attempt, Nandini reluctantly weds Vanraj. He tries to consummate their marriage on their wedding night, but Nandini is disgusted by his approach and acts coldly toward him. He asks her for an explanation, but she chooses to remain silent.

Nandini finally receives Sameer's letters, and Vanraj walks in on her reading them. He is enraged and initially decides to return her to her parents, but soon realizes that since she is in love with another man, the right thing to do would be to unite the pair. Vanraj seeks his parents' consent, which they give after disagreeing at first. Nandini and Vanraj arrive in Italy but come up against dead ends searching for Sameer. During their search, they are mugged and Nandini is shot in the arm. Moved by Vanraj's gentleness and affection towards her, Nandini begins to warm up to him. Eventually, they are able to locate Sameer through his mother, and Vanraj dutifully arranges for their meeting on the night of Sameer's debut concert. He then bids farewell to Nandini and walks away, heartbroken.

Upon meeting Sameer, she apologizes to him and tells him that she has come to love Vanraj. She reflects upon the unwavering love and devotion that Vanraj has showered upon her throughout their relationship, and realizes that Vanraj is her true soul mate. Sameer realizes she no longer has the love for him that he once saw in her. Heartbroken, Sameer lets her go back to Vanraj, which she readily accepts, and Sameer breaks down after she leaves, and his mother consoles him. She runs back to Vanraj and tells him that she cannot live without him. Vanraj adorns a mangala sutra around her neck, and they embrace each other.

Cast
Salman Khan as Sameer Rossellini 
Ajay Devgn as Vanraj 
Aishwarya Rai as Nandini Darbar
Zohra Sehgal as the grandmother
Vikram Gokhale as Pundit Darbar
Smita Jaykar as Amrita
Rekha Rao as Kamna
Rajeev Verma as Vikramjeet
 Kenneth Desai as Bhairav
 Ghanshyam Naik as Vitthal
Vinay Pathak as Tarun
Sheeba Chaddha as Anupama
 Meenakshi Verma as Pushpa
 Preeti Koppikar as Radha
 Divya Jagdale as Sanjukta
 Kanu Gill as Vanraj's mother
 Dimple Inamdar as Shilpa 
 Akash Karnataki as Bharat
Helen as Sameer's mother (special appearance)

Release

DVD
In 2000, Video-sound company in the United States, released the official DVD edition of the film with a "making of" segment. The main feature was presented in an aspect ratio of 1.85 and the original Dolby Digital 5.1 mix.

The second release was by Digital Entertainment Inc. This was a collectors' edition two-disc set, filled with supplementary features. These included:
 Making of the film
 IIFA 2000 and Zee Gold awards, 2000
 Television Promos
 Theatrical Trailer
 Subtitles in English, Spanish, French, Japanese and Arabic
 Dolby Digital 5.1 Surround Audio
 Anamorphic Widescreen Presentation
 Information Booklet

Shemaroo and Eros International released single-disc editions in the India market, sans supplementary features.

The movie was released under its English title Straight From The Heart. This DVD was released by Pathfinder Home Entertainment, which was a port of the Digital Entertainment Inc. edition, sans supplementary features.

OTT

Eros International holds rights to this film and has released it in VCD and DVD formats, but without any picture and sound enhancement. The high-definition version of this film is available on the Eros Now website in its uncut format, with improved picture and sound quality.

World television premiere
The film's television premiere was on Sony Entertainment Television.

Reception
Hum Dil De Chuke Sanam was well received by most critics — especially for its emotional content, cinematography and soundtrack — as well as the performances of the lead actors and a surprising performance by guest star Helen.

Ken Eisner said "this three-hour spectacular is stuffed with songs, romance, comedy, devotional material, and color-soaked dance numbers that are huge even by Hindi standards." Michael Dequina writing for TheMovieReport.com said of the three leads "Rai, in a luminous, award-winning performance (largely considered her big dramatic breakthrough—and justifiably so), fills in the conflicted emotional shades that Khan fails to bring with his one-dimensional presence; and Devgn's soulful subtlety does its job in suggesting Sameer to be a more formidable romantic adversary than viewers would see him as being." The reviewer for Filmfare felt it was a "once-in-a-decade type of extravaganza" and wrote, "Cinematographically, the movie is flawless and by virtue of this fact alone, a must-see. It aims at capturing poetry on screen without becoming pretentious. The music by Ismail Darbar is simply enchanting. The film juxtaposes Indian thematic content with exotic foreign locales."

A huge hit at the Indian box office, Hum Dil De Chuke Sanam became the third highest-grossing Bollywood film of 1999 with over $200 million. It also did well at the foreign box office, with  85 million.

Soundtrack

The soundtrack had lyrics by Mehboob Kotwal and music by Ismail Darbar. Voices on the soundtrack include those of Kavita Krishnamurthy, Alka Yagnik, Kumar Sanu, Udit Narayan, Hariharan, Vinod Rathod, Sultan Khan, Shankar Mahadevan, KK, and others. It received nine Filmfare Award nominations in the music and singing categories and produced some winners as well. Vikas Bhatnagar of Planet Bollywood gave the soundtrack 10 out of 10 stars and said it has "cemented it's [sic] place in the history books of greatest ever Hindi soundtracks." According to the Indian trade website, box office India the film's soundtrack sold 3.5 million units sold, this films soundtrack was the third highest selling album of the year.

Track listing

Accolades

Notes

References

External links
 
 Hum Dil De Chuke Sanam at Bollywood Hungama

1999 films
1990s Hindi-language films
Films directed by Sanjay Leela Bhansali
Films shot in Hungary
Films shot in India
Films set in Gujarat
Films set in Italy
Indian romantic drama films
Indian romantic musical films
1999 romantic drama films
1990s romantic musical films
Films based on Indian novels
Films based on romance novels
Films whose cinematographer won the Best Cinematography National Film Award
Films shot in Gujarat
Films about composers
Films whose production designer won the Best Production Design National Film Award
Films featuring a Best Choreography National Film Award-winning choreography
Hindi films remade in other languages